Exceptional Children is a quarterly peer-reviewed academic journal covering the field of special education. The editors-in-chief are John Wills Lloyd and William J. Therrien (University of Virginia). It was established in 1934 and is published by SAGE Publications on behalf of the Council for Exceptional Children.

Abstracting and indexing 
The journal is abstracted and indexed in:
 ERIC
 Scopus
 ProQuest
 Social Sciences Citation Index
 Current Contents/Social & Behavioral Sciences
According to the Journal Citation Reports, the journal has a 2017 impact factor of 3.34, ranking it 1st out of 40 journals in the category "Special Education" and 2nd out of 69 journals in the category "Rehabilitation".

See also 
 Teaching Exceptional Children

References

External links 
  

SAGE Publishing academic journals
English-language journals
Special education journals
Quarterly journals
Publications established in 1934